London Booster is an art installation by Czech artist David Černý. It's a bus fitted with hydraulic arms, allowing it to do push ups, accompanied by audio-visual effects. It was created to celebrate the 2012 Summer Olympics and inspire the Czech Republic Olympic team. It was installed outside the Business Design Centre in Islington, which for the duration of the games was transformed into 'Czech House'.

Past the Olympics, the bus is publicly located in Prague neighborhood Chodov. It is located in front of the building of Agrofert company of Andrej Babiš which was a sponsor of the work (next to the bus stop Benkova). It exercises everyday from 3 to 3:30 PM, except for cold days (below 5 °C), rainfall, snow cover or strong wind.

Bus 
The bus itself is a 1958 Bristol Lodekka LD double-decker with ECW bodywork. Despite being painted red, it never saw use as a London bus - it was new to the Isle of Wight-based operator Southern Vectis, numbered 555, registered ODL 15, and painted in their green livery. After 20 years service it was sold to a dealer who exported it to a museum in the Netherlands. In the 1990s it was sold to a private operator, who returned it to use in the Netherlands as a red liveried corporate hospitality vehicle, registered BE-27-64. Černý sourced it in December 2011 from a Dutch dealer.

References

External links

 Video of moving London Booster on YouTube

2012 establishments in the Czech Republic
2012 sculptures
Art vehicles
Customised buses
Double-decker buses
Kinetic sculptures in the Czech Republic
Outdoor sculptures in Prague
Sculptures of sports
Works by Czech people
Chodov (Prague)
21st-century architecture in the Czech Republic